Harper is an unincorporated community in Ross County, in the U.S. state of Ohio.

History
A former variant name was Harpers Station. The namesake Harper's Station depot was located on the Marietta and Cincinnati Railroad. A post office called Harpers Station was established in 1867, and remained in operation until 1927.

References

Unincorporated communities in Ross County, Ohio
Unincorporated communities in Ohio
1867 establishments in Ohio